Osmanabad Airport is a public airport located off NH 211, 10 km north of the town of Osmanabad, in the Marathwada region of Maharashtra, India.

The airfield was built in 1984 and managed by the Public Works Department of the State Government. In 2009, Reliance Airport Developers won a bid to run the airport on a 95-year lease along with four other airports— Nanded, Baramati, Yavatmal and Latur. The airport does not see any air traffic apart from visits from the odd state government aircraft and operations of the flying school based here.

Structure
Osmanabad airport has one runway oriented 04/22, 1,200 metres in length with a 10 metre wide parallel taxiway running along its entire length on the north side. It has an apron measuring 60 metres by 80 metres connected to the southwest end of the runway by means of a taxi-way. MIDC has constructed a terminal building next to the apron at a cost of Rs. 89 Lacs. The flying school has a separate apron and hangar on the northern edge of the airfield.

See also
 Reliance Infrastructure
 Guru Gobind Singhji Airport - Nanded
 Latur Airport
 Baramati Airport
 Osmanabad Airport
 Yavatmal airport

References

Airports in Maharashtra
Osmanabad district
Airports established in 1984
1984 establishments in Maharashtra
20th-century architecture in India